The history of shopping malls in Texas began with the oldest shopping center in the United States, Highland Park Village, which opened in 1931 in the Dallas–Fort Worth Metroplex.  The latter and Greater Houston area are both home to numerous regional shopping malls and shopping centers located in various areas of the city.

Enclosed Shopping malls by region

Dallas-Fort Worth Metroplex

Houston

San Antonio

Shopping malls in Texas, outside of the three largest metropolitan areas

Austin
 Barton Creek Square - South Austin
 Lakeline Mall - North Austin

El Paso
 Bassett Place - El Paso
 Cielo Vista Mall - El Paso
 Las Palmas Marketplace - El Paso
 Sunland Park Mall - El Paso
 The Fountains at Farah - El Paso
 The Outlet Shoppes at El Paso - El Paso

Corpus Christi
 La Palmera - Corpus Christi
 Sunrise Mall - Corpus Christi

Rio Grande Valley
 Sunrise Mall - Brownsville
 Amigoland Mall - Brownsville
 Valle Vista Mall - Harlingen
 La Plaza Mall - McAllen
 Rio Grande Valley Premium Outlets - Mercedes

Killeen-Temple
 Killeen Mall - Killeen
 Temple Mall - Temple

Midland-Odessa
 Midland Park Mall - Midland
 Music City Mall - Odessa

Beaumont-Port Arthur
 Central Mall - Port Arthur
 Parkdale Mall - Beaumont

Other, listed By 2010 metropolitan area size
 South Plains Mall - Lubbock (290,002 - metropolitan area population)
 Longview Mall - Longview (282,962)
 Broadway Square Mall - Tyler (264,521)
 Mall del Norte - Laredo (256,496)
 Westgate Mall - Amarillo (253,823)
 Richland Mall - Waco (238,564)
 Post Oak Mall - College Station (231,623)
 Mall of Abilene - Abilene (166,416)
 Sikes Senter - Wichita Falls (150,261)
 Central Mall - Texarkana (136,552)
 Midway Mall - Sherman (121,419)
 Victoria Mall - Victoria (116,230)
 Sunset Mall - San Angelo (113,443)
 Lufkin Mall - Lufkin (87,669)
 West Hill Mall - Huntsville (66,296)
 Mall de Las Aguilas - Eagle Pass (55,405)
 Plaza del Sol Mall - Del Rio (49,106)
 Heartland Mall - Brownwood (38,186)

References

Texas
 
Shopping malls